Lourdes Virginia Moran Poe (born February 11, 1989), popularly known as Lovi Poe, is a Filipino actress, model, and recording artist. She is the daughter of action star Fernando Poe Jr.

Poe is known for starring in two popular GMA drama series: Bakekang (2006) as Kristal, and Ang Dalawang Mrs. Real (2014) as Shiela. She received her first Best Actress award in the 2010 Cinemalaya Independent Film Festival for the film Mayohan in the role of Lilibeth. The same year, she was also a FAMAS Best Actress awardee for the film Sagrada Familia in the role of Kath Asero.

In 2021, Poe transferred to ABS-CBN.

Early and personal life
Lovi Poe was born as Lourdes Virginia Moran Poe in St. Luke's Medical Center in Quezon City, to Filipino actors Fernando Poe Jr. and Rowena Moran. It was in February 2004 when Poe Jr. admitted to the public that he has a daughter with the former actress and beauty queen making her and Senator Grace Poe half-sisters.

Poe finished high school at the Colegio San Agustin in Makati where she graduated in 2007. She then later took courses at the International Academy of Management and Economics and Miriam College.

Poe has dated actors Cogie Domingo, Jolo Revilla, Jake Cuenca, Rocco Nacino, and politician Ronald Singson. As of 2017, Poe is romantically linked with French-Filipino Chris Johnson, whom she previously denied dating the previous year in August.

Career
It was in 2006 when Poe was handpicked by an international singing duo named Same Same to perform with them the song "Without You," which is included in the duo's debut album "The Meaning of Happy."  She was then first paired with Cogie Domingo in the youth-oriented drama Love to Love. Her biggest acting break came when she played the character of Kristal Maisog in the hit 2006 drama, Bakekang. Her co-star Sunshine Dizon pushed her to join show business as an actress. Her acting performance in Bakekang gained critical praise and was named as Best New Female TV Personality in the 21st PMPC Star Awards for Television. In 2007, Poe was cast in Zaido: Pulis Pangkalawakan (a Philippine spin-off of Shaider) as a newspaper journalist who is a close friend of policeman Alexis Lorenzo (played by Marky Cielo) who turned into the superhero Zaido Green.

In 2008, she played another starring role in the character of Joanna on the afternoon drama, Sine Novela: Kaputol ng Isang Awit, alongside Glaiza de Castro, Marky Cielo and Jolo Revilla.

In 2008, she won the New Movie Actress of the Year award in the 24th PMPC Star Awards for Movies for the film Shake, Rattle and Roll 9. She was also part of the Gabby Concepcion 20-city tour which kicked off on August 17, 2008. Her Bloom solo concert at Music Museum was held on October 16. Bloom is also the title of her second album under SonyBMG. She was also cast in the film Paukay-Ukay by Regal Entertainment. She also co-starred in LaLola (2008) and Ang Babaeng Hinugot sa Aking Tadyang (2009).

Poe appeared in the TV5 youth-oriented drama Lipgloss; GMA Network previously did not allow her to join the series as per network policy stating their contract talents be exclusive to their network. Her manager, Leo Dominguez defended their move saying that "Lovi does not have an existing contract with GMA." Since then, Poe has not appeared in any of GMA Network shows. It was also reported that she entertained offers from GMA's rival network ABS-CBN, until her manager decided to accept GMA's offer to cast Poe in the new sitcom Show Me Da Manny. In 2010, she was a regular host on the GMA Sunday noontime variety show Party Pilipinas. In July 2010, she appeared in the independent film Mayohan for which she won her first acting award, the Cinemalaya Independent Film Festival Award for Best Actress.

After 15 years with GMA Network, Poe moved to ABS-CBN on September 16, 2021. Her first television drama project is the Flower of Evil (2022) with Piolo Pascual.

Discography

Studio albums
 Bloom (2008, Sony BMG)
 The Best of My Heart (2006, Sony BMG)

Singles
 "Huwag Kang Mangako" (Akin Pa Rin ang Bukas theme song) (2013)
 "Even If" (The Bride and the Lover theme song) (2013)
 "Love Affair" (featuring Viktoria Vixen) (2013)
 "Suddenly It's Magic" (My Valentine Girls theme song) (2011)
 "Dito sa Puso" (Wanted: Perfect Family theme song) (2009)
 "Nais Ko" (Kaputol ng Isang Awit theme song) with Glaiza de Castro (2008)
 "Sana" (2008)
 "I Love You" (2006)
 "I Never Knew Love" (2006)
 "Kung Pwede Lang" (2006)
 "Tayong Dalawa" (Bakekang theme song) (2006)

As a featured artist
 "One Night, One Kiss" (2016, JC de Vera)
 "Lov na Lov" (2007, Gloc-9)
 "Without You" (2006, Same Same)

Concerts
 Fantaisie (2016, Music Museum)
 Bloom (2008, Music Museum)

Filmography

Television

Television series

Television shows

Drama anthologies

TV specials

Film

Accolades

References

External links

Lovi Poe at iGMA.tv

1989 births
Filipino child actresses
Filipino film actresses
Filipino child singers
Filipino women pop singers
Living people
Viva Artists Agency
People from Quezon City
Actresses from Manila
Lovi
21st-century Filipino actresses
Miriam College alumni
GMA Network personalities
ABS-CBN personalities
Filipino television variety show hosts
21st-century Filipino singers
21st-century Filipino women singers
Filipino people of Spanish descent
Filipino people of Catalan descent
Filipino people of Irish descent
Filipino people of American descent